A Campingflight to Lowlands Paradise (commonly called Lowlands or Lowlands Festival), is an annual three-day music and performing arts festival, held in the Netherlands.

Although the main focus is on music - rock, pop, dance, hip hop and alternative - Lowlands also offers indoor and outdoor cinema, (street) theatre, cabaret and stand-up, ballet, literature and comic strips.

In recent years, the festival is attended by around 55,000 visitors, and features over 200 acts on more than ten stages every year which are named according to the NATO phonetic alphabet apart from the Heineken stage (named after the beer brewer Heineken, the main sponsor of the festival since 2015). The majority of stages are inside large tents to protect spectators against inclement weather, with the largest being approximately the size of a regulation football pitch.

History

1967–1968: Origin and debacle
The festival is a successor to one of the first Dutch pop festivals: A Flight to Lowlands Paradise that was organised in November 1967 by the Utrecht-based artist and painter Bunk Bessel. This festival took place in the Margriethal of Jaarbeurs Utrecht. The entry fee was 10 Dutch guilders (approximately €4.50), including breakfast. This 18-hour-long event had no top acts but included experimental theatre, dancing, poetry, films, body painting and massage.

On 28 December 1968, this festival was held a second time, postponed by a month from its original date of 23 November in an attempt to get Jimi Hendrix to attend the event. This could not be arranged, and other large acts such as Jeff Beck and Jethro Tull were cancelled. However, Pink Floyd remained on the bill. In the end, the show was sold out to its capacity of 18,000 visitors, though many attendees were unable to get inside resulting in unrest and police intervention.

1993–1997: Revival and growth

In August 1993 the first edition of "A Campingflight To Lowlands Paradise" takes place after Willem Venema revived it. Weather conditions are moderate: barely 15 degrees Celsius and rain on Friday and Sunday being the best day with a maximum of 18 degrees Celsius. Tickets were bought at the entrance for 75 guilders and people receive a drawn floor plan. People are allowed to put up a tent to the left after the entrance with behind it a camping shop. The festival site consists of nothing more than a small stage tent and a larger one. People visit the festival for Rage Against the Machine and on Saturday Urban Dance Squad. Organizer Mojo Concerts aims for 10,000 visitors, but only 7,000 finally visit the festival. A month prior the festival was almost canceled because of messy organization and slow ticket sales. However, Mojo continued and made sure the line-up consisted of big names. This was partly possible because Lowlands is programmed in the same weekend as Pukkelpop (Belgium) and Reading (Great Britain), so the big American rock bands didn't have to come across for only one performance. 1994 was the first edition in which certain things would become characteristic for the following decades. Tents are named after the NATO phonetic alphabet: Alpha, Bravo, and Charlie. Peter te Bos, singer of rock band Claw Boys Claw and a graphic designer, takes care of the design and mascot: "Rapid Razor Bob" with a razor mouth. This style would stay the appearance of Lowlands for more than twenty years, until the collaboration ended in October 2016. Partly due to the extra tent, up to 12,500 people come to Lowlands, five thousand people more than the year before.

Rapid growth continues the next year in 1995: 20,000 people visit the festival. Different this year is that it becomes a broader cultural festival. The three tent for music from the year before (Alpha, Bravo, Charlie) are back, with a new tent for theatre called Delta and the Echo for comedy. For the first time ever the festival is sold out. Because of electricity issues, The Prodigy's performance was delayed till later in the evening. Amsterdam hip hop group Osdorp Posse had their performance early Saturday evening in the Charlie tent. Frontman Def P shouts "They should have fucking put us in the big tent, pull a fucking tent peg out of the ground and let the cancer ceiling collapse". Security people headed towards the Charlie tent to keep order. According to Def P it was a miracle that there were no deaths.

In 1996 Lowlands becomes a big 'crossover' festival, showcasing many different types of genres like pop, rock, grunge, dance, house, hiphop and a lot in between. Side programming consisting of film and cabaret also expands. The festival grows to 31,000 visitors and the price of a ticket doubled since 1993 to 140 guilders (about 63,50 euros). There are more than 100 acts and 6 tents. Two new tents are introduced: Foxtrot and Golf. More different types of food is introduced, something which distinguishes Lowlands from other festivals. Instead of only fries and burgers, people can choose from Mexican, Spanish, Italian and Surinam cuisine, and even a separate stand for vegetarians. Sunday evening a few visitors pull over a few containers with squeezed oranges behind a juice stall, which start a big, meanwhile iconic, fight with orange peels.

In 1997 gabber is very popular and Lowlands decided to make place for Dj Dano, however, he quickly got beer thrown at him and stopped his performance in the Alpha early. It showed visitors of Lowlands drew a line in terms of the variety of music genres. Punkband Pennywise stops its performance after 20 minutes because a crowdsurfing girl falls and gets angry at the security shouting "Why didn’t you catch that girl? I saw her breaking her arm, you damned motherfucker." after which security leaves and fans climb on stage in anarchy. The 1997 edition received 40,000 visitors, paying 145 guilders. In five years time, the festival grew in fivefold and is almost as big as older Pinkpop. Infrastructure can't keep up and people complain it's too crowded. However people and newspapers still praised the festival. Life of Agony released a CD of their unplugged set from the Lowlands Festival in 1997, entitled Unplugged at the Lowlands Festival '97.

1998–2002: The "bridge of death" and end to rapid growth
Instead of growing in amounts of tents, Lowlands needed to grow in surface area. In order to do this they crossed the trunk road in 1998 by building an improvised bridge and hosted the camping on the other side. The bridge nowadays has the nickname "the bridge of death" because it's very hard for visitors to cross the bridge with their packaging and it became an icon for Lowlands. Also, for the first time ever, Lowlands stopped using the NATO phonetic alphabet for tent names to give priority to commercial parties. Delta became Dommelsch, named after the beer supplier. The 1998 edition received 45.000 visitors. On Friday evening, many people headed to the Alpha stage to see the Beastie Boys with their worldwide hit song Intergalactic. However, it was so crowded people in the front came under pressure and the show got stopped temporarily in order for the band to ask people to stop pushing and help other people get up.

In 1999 Lowlands reaches a state which shows many things at the terrain will remain the same for years ahead, because of maximum use of capacity. A new medium-sized tent called India is introduced for smaller pop and rock bands. The Dommelsch becomes an outdoor cinema after 23.00 and the night programming becomes more important as in almost all tents dj's and parties keep going on till late. Lowlands also expands more on the cultural side with serious theatre, stand-up comedy and literature. About 58.000 people visit the festival and pay 160 guilders for a ticket. At the camping, a visitor climbs in a light pole but falls and doesn't survive.

The ninth edition of Lowlands in 2000 starts with a minute of silence and a strict crowd-surfing prohibition because of the Roskilde incident, at which 9 people died at a Pearl Jam performance.

In 2001 even more people visit the festival, but maximum capacity seems reached, with 57.000 people. At the same time, this edition was the warmest ever (till 2012 beat the record) with 30 degrees Celsius on Sunday.

With the introduction of the euro, prices of Lowlands went up from 195 guilders (88,50) in 2001 to 97,50 euro in 2002, however prices had been raised anyway so the euro didn't have much impact. 60,000 people visit the festival, but this seems too much. People complain about the crowdedness and weather conditions are bad. Festival director Eric van Eerdenburg, who had just been appointed, sees something needs to change in order to make Lowlands the festival people always loved.

2003–2012: Needs for innovation and golden era
In 2003, festival director Eric van Eerdenburg takes measures because Lowlands 2002 was too crowded and had a for many people disappointing line-up. For the first time ever the festival did not sell out and fewer people visited the festival, from 60.000 in 2002 to 48.000 in 2003. Ticket pricing goes from 97.50 euros to 107.50 euros which might have crossed a psychological limit. For the first time, biodegradable plastic is used. The Charlie tent disappears and the large Dommelsch stage is exchanged for a covered tent with the same name (this tent is later renamed to Grolsch in 2004 and to Heineken in 2015). Also, silent disco headphones are introduced.

A running gag takes over entire Lowlands in 2004: a year earlier, a boy named Theo Vlaar stepped out of the line at the entrance to pee, but upon his return, he lost his friends. They kept calling him and other people took over. This continued in 2004 and the years to come and shouting "Theo!" (or other random names) became part of Lowlands subculture. Just like in 2003, Lowlands does not sell out, but nonetheless 4,000 more people show up. 52,000 people visit the festival. For the first time there is a deposit on plastic cups. When handing in a few, people earn a coin (about 2 euros).

In 2005 Lowlands is doing better and makes good progress, also because the festival was shifted a week forward, from the last to the third weekend of August, because there are then more major international acts nearby. Lowlands sells out at the door.

A year later Lowlands is doing even better. In 2006, all tickets sell out a month prior. The X-ray is introduced, a dome of corrugated galvanised iron at which more experimental, border-seeking acts are programmed. Also the "Magneetbar" (Magnet bar) is introduced, a small tent for visitors to perform.

In 2007, the festival sells out again, but it takes a week longer than in 2006. The Magneetbar gets bigger because of its popularity. A year later in 2008, all tickets had been sold on 21 June. The festival was never sold out so quick.

For the first and last time ever, the ticket sales in 2010 start with a launch party. It seemed very effective as it took only 1 week in February to sell out all tickets. According to the organization, this was not the intention because loyal visitors didn't have a fair chance.

In 2011 the financial crisis is still partly going on, and the First Rutte cabinet, which was appointed in October 2010, had to make major cuts. The culture sector was one of the main victims, including an increase in VAT on concert tickets as of January 1, 2011. Lowlands took measures and started the ticket sale way earlier in November 2010. This was a success and within 2 hours all tickets had been sold (after all the VAT increase was delayed by 6 months and after the fall of the First Rutte cabinet in April 2012, the VAT increase was reversed). For the first time in a decade Lowlands changes the terrain again. The Bravo tent is moved to make room for something new: the Titty Twïster, a strip club with literature at day and striptease performers at night.

With 27 degrees Celsius on Friday and even warmer temperatures on Saturday and Sunday, Lowlands 2012 becomes the warmest Lowlands ever. Foo Fighters was programmed to give a 2,5 hour lasting performance, but stopped after 2 hours because it was too warm.

2013–present: Reinvention and new audience

In January 2013, booking office Friendly Fire, a competitor of Lowlands organiser Mojo, announces a new three-day music festival called Best Kept Secret. The first four names - Arctic Monkeys, Portishead, Alt-J and Sigur Rós - show that Lowlands is no longer the only place for Indie music. However, it had no effect on this edition because just like the year before, the tickets (at 175 euro) sold out within two hours. On the Monday after the festival the message follows that an Amsterdam visitor who was found in a comatose state on a remote part of the grounds during the first night, later died in hospital. He had used ecstasy but it is not clear if that was the cause of death.

The following year in 2014 it took many times longer before Lowlands sold out. According to festival director Eric van Eerdenburg it seemed that "a part of the older generation is dropping out". Big dance acts like Skrillex, Major Lazer and Disclosure create a new kind of audience, but at the same time repel the rock lovers for whom it was mainly intended a long time ago. Another explanation for the declining interest in that group may be that Lowlands organizer Mojo was setting up a new festival called Down the Rabbit Hole, a cuddlier version with more attention for alternative music. Lowlands abolishes the deposit-return system on plastic mugs after years of complaints about people who mainly come to the festival to collect mugs and allegedly use them to collect around 1,000 euros a day, and in some cases are also guilty of pickpocketing and theft.

In advance of 2015, it is predicted that this 23rd edition will be crucial for the future of Lowlands. Some of the loyal visitors are dropping out and the festival ends up in a quarterlife crisis. Domestic and foreign competition on the festival market, causing audiences to stay away and big acts to charge ever higher amounts of money, makes festival director Eric van Eerdenburg "terribly" worried. Lowlands does not sell out, for the first time since 2004. Just over 48,000 people come to the festival, which has a capacity of 55,000 people. Small changes take place on the site: the smaller tents Charlie and Lima swap places and the Tïtty Twïster disappears after four years. The two largest tents, the Alpha and the Bravo, are made a bit smaller to make them more cosy. The third beer supplier in Lowlands history makes its appearance: after Dommelsch (1993-2003) and Grolsch (2004-2014) the organisation now signs a contract with Heineken.

In 2017, Hansje van Halem was appointed head designer of the Lowlands festival identity after 20 years of collaboration between designer Peter te Bos and Lowlands.

Editions
Note: the organization of Lowlands marks 1993 as the official first edition. Prices prior to the introduction of the euro on 1 January 2002 have been converted from guilders to euros. The 2020 and 2021 edition of Lowlands was cancelled due to the COVID-19 Pandemic.

References

External links

Music festivals in the Netherlands
Rock festivals in the Netherlands
Pop music festivals
Music festivals established in 1993
1993 establishments in the Netherlands
Music in Dronten